Shiraiwagawa Dam is a gravity concrete & fill dam (compound) dam located in Toyama prefecture in Japan. The dam is used for flood control and water supply. The catchment area of the dam is 24 km2. The dam impounds about 19  ha of land when full and can store 2200 thousand cubic meters of water. The construction of the dam was started on 1967 and completed in 1974.

References

Dams in Toyama Prefecture
1974 establishments in Japan